The following is a list of usurpers in the Roman Empire. For an overview of the problem and consequences of usurpation, see Roman usurpers. In the Eastern Roman Empire (395–1453), rebellion and usurpation were so notoriously frequent (in the vision of the medieval West, where usurpation was rare) that the modern term "byzantine" became a byword for political intrigue and conspiracy. For usurpation in the Eastern Roman Empire, see List of Byzantine usurpers.

Key
 kPG, killed by the Praetorian Guard
 kS, killed by own soldiers
 kB, killed in battle
 e, executed
 S, suicide
 dates are beginning and end of reign
 origin of the rebellion indicated where possible
 the list is complete until the advent of the tetrarchy in the end of the 3rd century

Usurpers who became legitimate emperors

The following individuals began as usurpers, but became the legitimate emperor either by establishing uncontested control of the empire or by confirmation of their position by the Roman Senate or by the legitimate emperor.

First Imperial civil war

 Galba – killed January 15, 69
 Otho – committed suicide April 16, 69
 Vitellius – killed December 22, 69
 Vespasian – secured the throne

Second Imperial civil war

 Septimius Severus (193–211)

Crisis of the Third Century

 Macrinus (217–218) in Syria, former prefect of the Praetorian Guard
 Elagabalus (218–222)
 Maximinus Thrax (235–238) in the Rhine, former centurion
 Gordian I and Gordian II (238) in Africa, suicide after defeat in battle
 Philip the Arab (244–249) in the East, former prefect of the Praetorian Guard
 Decius (249–251) in Pannonia
 Trebonianus Gallus (251–253)
 Aemilian (kS.253) in Italy
 Valerian (253–260)
 Claudius Gothicus (268–270)
 Quintillus (270)
 Aurelian (270–275)
 Florian (276)
 Probus (276–282)
 Carus (282–283)
 Diocletian (284–305)

Western Empire
 Constantine the Great (306–337)
 Maxentius (306–312)
 Vetranio (350)
 Julian the Apostate (360–363)
 Magnus Maximus (383–388) and Flavius Victor (384–388)
 Majorian (457–461)

The following last emperors of the West were all accepted by the Senate (possibly except for Constans II) but never recognized as colleagues by the Emperor of the East. Three of them (Constantine III, Priscus Attalus and Constans II) reigned alongside the legitimate Emperor of the West Honorius who one of them (Constantine III) recognized as his colleague in 409. Upon his recognition Constantine III, without the approval of Honorius, appointed his son Constans II co-emperor.

 Constantine III (407–411)
 Priscus Attalus (409–410)
 Constans II (409–411)
 Joannes (423–425)
 Petronius Maximus (455)
 Avitus (455–456) (unclear whether recognized by the Emperor of the East or not)
 Libius Severus (461–465)
 Olybrius (472)
 Glycerius (473–474)
 Romulus Augustulus (475–476)

Usurpers not considered legitimate emperors

The following individuals proclaimed themselves emperor (or were proclaimed or appointed as emperor), but are not considered as legitimate emperors because they did not oust the ruling emperor, or did not establish control of the whole empire, or were not accepted by the senate or other imperial colleagues.

They are listed here under the emperor whose rule they attempted to usurp. The noted date is the attempted year of usurpation.

Claudius: 41–54 
 Lucius Arruntius Camillus Scribonianus (42), the imperial legate of Dalmatia. Considered a possible successor to Caligula, he committed suicide on the island of Issa after his troops abandoned him.

Galba: 68–69 
 Nymphidius Sabinus (68), Nero's Praetorian Prefect, declared himself emperor after Nero's suicide, claiming he was the illegitimate son of Caligula. Killed by the Praetorian Guard as Galba approached Rome.

Titus: 79–81 
 Terentius Maximus, in Asia, took refuge with Artabanus, a Parthian leader, resembled Nero

Domitian: 81–96 
 Lucius Antonius Saturninus (89), in Germania Superior, governor of Germania Superior, could not bring in Germanic allies because the Rhine thawed, put down by Lucius Appius Maximus Norbanus.

Marcus Aurelius: 161–180 
 Avidius Cassius (175), in Egypt and Syria, governor of Syria, declared himself emperor upon the rumor that Marcus Aurelius had died, continued his revolt even upon learning Marcus Aurelius was alive.

Septimius Severus: 193–211 
 Pescennius Niger (193–194), in Egypt, Asia and Syria, governor of Syria, proclaimed himself emperor after the death of Pertinax, defeated in battle and killed while fleeing to Parthia.
 Clodius Albinus (196–197), in Britain and Gaul, governor of Britain, originally Septimius Severus's ally until Pescennius Niger was killed, killed at the battle of Lugdunum.

Elagabalus: 218–222 
 Gellius Maximus (219), in Syria, executed, originally an officer of Legio IV Scythica
 Verus (late 219), in Syria, executed, commander of Legio III Gallica
 Uranius (c. 221), questioned existence and date; sources place him in 253
 Seleucus (after 221). He could be Julius Antonius Seleucus, in Moesia, or M. Flavius Vitellius Seleucus, consul for 221

Alexander Severus: 222–235 
 Sallustius (c. 227), in Rome, raised to Caesar by Alexander, executed for attempted murder, prefect of the Praetorian Guard
 Taurinus (S. date unclear), in the East, committed suicide in the Euphrates after being hailed Augustus
 Ovinius Camillus, alleged usurper mentioned only in the Historia Augusta, now thought to have been fictitious

Maximinus Thrax: 235–238 
 Magnus (235), ordered some soldiers of Maximinus to destroy the bridge that allowed the Emperor to cross back the Rhine, a former consul
 Quartinus (235), in the East, supported by soldiers loyal to former emperor Alexander Severus

Gordian III: 238–244 
 Sabinianus (240), in Africa, governor of the province

Philip the Arab: 244–249 
 Iotapianus (kS.248), in the East
 Pacatian (kS.248), in the Danube frontier, killed by soldiers
 Silbannacus in the Rhine, uncertain date

Decius: 249–251 
 Licinianus (250) in Rome, executed
 Priscus (251–k?252) in Thrace
 Valens Senior in Illyria, great-uncle of Valens Thessalonicus

Gallienus: 253–268 

 Ingenuus (260) in Pannonia, committed suicide, former governor
 Macrianus Major, Macrianus Minor and Quietus (September 260 – Autumn 261) in the East, all killed by their own soldiers in different occasions
 Regalianus (260) in Pannonia, ruled with his wife
 Balista (also: Ballista) (Autumn e.261) in the East, former Praetorian prefect, associated with the former
 Piso (kS.261) in Achaea, questioned existence
 Valens (k.261) in Achaea, killed by Macrinus, former governor
 Memor (e.261) in Egypt
 Mussius Aemilianus (261 – Spring e.262) in Egypt
 The emperors of the Gallic Empire
The emperors of the Palmyrene Empire
 The fictitious usurpers:
 Celsus
 Saturninus — Possibly the villain in Shakespeare's Titus Andronicus
 Trebellianus

Claudius II: 268–270 
 Censorinus (269–kS.270), almost certainly non-existent: "attested" only by the Augustan History (Trig. Tyr. 33) with no literary, epigraphical, numismatic support of any kind.

Aurelian: 270–275 
 Sponsianus in Dacia, contested numismatic evidence only
 Domitianus (270–271) most probably in Southern Gaul. He was probably encouraged by Aurelian's difficulties in dealing with an Alamannic incursion into Italy that occurred early in his reign. His bid for power could have been suppressed by Aurelian's Praetorian Prefect, Placidianus who was in the Rhone valley at the time or by Tetricus, the Gallic Emperor.
 Felicissimus (k.271) in Rome, a civil servant involved in corruption
 Septimius (kS.271) in Dalmatia
 Urbanus (271), questioned existence
 Firmus (k.273) in Egypt, questioned existence

Probus: 276–282 
 Bonosus (280) 
 Proculus (280) 
 Saturninus (280)

Carus, Carinus, Numerian: 282–284 
 Sabinus Julianus

Diocletian: 284–305 
 Amandus and Aelianus: (285)
 Carausius: (286–293)
 Allectus: (293–296)
 Domitius Domitianus: (297)
 Aurelius Achilleus: (297–298)
 Eugenius: (303)

Galerius: 305–311 
 Domitius Alexander (308–e.311)

Constantine I: 309–337 
 Calocaerus (e.333/334)

Constantius II: 337–361 
 Magnentius (350–353)
 Nepotianus (350)
 Carausius II (354–358), questioned existence
 Silvanus (355)

Valens: 364–378 
 Procopius (366)
 Marcellus (366)
 Theodorus (372)

Valentinian I: 364–375 
 Firmus (372–375)

Theodosius I: 379–395 
 Eugenius (392–e.394)

Honorius: 395–423 
 Marcus: (406–407)
 Gratian: (407)
 Maximus of Hispania: (409–411, 420–421)
 Priscus Attalus: (414–415)
 Jovinus: (411–413)
 Sebastianus: (412–413)
 Heraclianus: (412–413)

Valentinian III: 423–455 
 Bonifacius: (427)

Anthemius: 467–472 
 Arvandus: (468)
 Romanus: (470)

Unsuccessful regional usurpers after the fall of Rome (476) 
 Julius Nepos (476–480) ruled as emperor in exile in Dalmatia since 475, tried to reclaim imperial throne from the barbarian regime in Italy lead by Odoacer around 479-480, killed by his soldiers in the same year.
 Burdunellus (e.496), in the Ebro valley
 Peter (e.506), in the Ebro valley

References 

Usurpers
Usurpers